(), which means , is the motto of the monarch of the United Kingdom. It appears on a scroll beneath the shield of the version of the coat of arms of the United Kingdom. The motto is said to have first been used by Richard I (1157–1199) as a battle cry and presumed to be a reference to his French ancestry (indeed he spoke French and Occitan but knew only basic English) and the concept of the divine right of the monarch to govern. It was adopted as the royal motto of England by King Henry V (1386–1422) with the phrase "and my right" referring to his claim by descent to the French crown.

Language
The motto is French for "God and my right", meaning that the king is "": King of England by the grace of God. It is used to imply that the monarch of a nation has a God-given (divine) right to rule.

For the Royal coat of arms of the Kingdom of England to have a French rather than English motto was not unusual, given that Norman French was the primary language of the English Royal Court and ruling class following the rule of William the Conqueror of Normandy and later the Plantagenets. Another Old French phrase also appears in the full achievement of the Royal Arms. The motto of the Order of the Garter,  ("Spurned be the one who thinks ill of it"), appears on a representation of a garter behind the shield.

Other translations
 has been translated in several ways, including "God and my right", "God and my right hand", "God and my lawful right", and "God and my right shall me defend".

However, Kearsley's Complete Peerage, published in 1799, translates it to mean "God and my right hand" (in standard French that would be , not ). The Kearsley volume appeared during publication of the 1st edition (1796–1808) of the German , which emphasised the raising of the "right hand" during installations and coronations of German Kings.

Use as royal motto

 has generally been used as the motto of English monarchs, and later by British monarchs, since being adopted by Henry V. It was first used as a battle cry by King Richard I in 1198 at the Battle of Gisors, when he defeated the forces of Philip II of France and after he made it his motto. The belief in medieval Europe was not that victory automatically went to the side with the better army but that, as with personal trial by combat, to the side that God viewed with favour. Hence Richard wrote after his victory "It is not us who have done it but God and our right through us". So after his victories on the crusades "Richard was speaking what he believed to be the truth when he told the Holy Roman Emperor: 'I am born of a rank which recognises no superior but God.

Alternatively, the Royal Arms may depict a monarch's personal motto. For example, Elizabeth I and Queen Anne's often displayed ; Latin for "Always the same", and James I's depicted , Latin for "Blessed are the peacemakers".

Current usages

 has been adopted along with the rest of the Royal Coat of Arms by The Times as part of its masthead. When it incorporated the Coat of Arms in 1875, half the newspapers in London were also doing so. Since 1982 the paper abandoned the use of the current Royal Coat of Arms and returned to using the Hanoverian coat of arms of 1785.

Versions of the Coat of Arms, with the motto, is used by various newspapers, including Melbourne's The Age in Australia, Christchurch's The Press in New Zealand, the UK's Daily Mail, and Canada's Victoria Times Colonist. It is also used in Hardwick Hall in England on the fireplace of The High Great Chamber, also known as the Presence Chamber, though there it reads , God is my right. instead creating an additional 'ES' monogram. The extra E and S are a superimposition on the original E. This was added at a later date after the original writing was put up; to deface the Royal Arms would have been very dangerous, hence why it was added later.

It is also found on the official belt buckle of the Jamaica Constabulary Force; the front page of a British passport; the rank slide of a warrant officer in the British and other Commonwealth armed forces; the arms of the Supreme Court of Victoria and Supreme Court of New South Wales; and the crests of Hawthorn Rowing Club in Melbourne, Australia, Nottingham Law School, and Sherborne School.

The coined phrase was also used by Michael Jackson at his Neverland Ranch's front gates. The crest on the main gates carried the Royal Coat of Arms of the United Kingdom, along with the phrase at the bottom.

The motto was formerly included in a scroll on the Western Australia Police Force coat of arms, before being replaced with "Protect and Serve" when the organisation changed its name from Western Australia Police Force to Western Australia Police Service.

It is the motto of Queen Elizabeth's School, Barnet.

It is the motto of the Royal Grammar School, Guildford, England.

It is the motto of King Edward VI Five Ways School, Birmingham, England.

It is also found on the Old Customs House in Sydney, Australia. The Royal Coat of Arms is intricately carved in sandstone, located above the main entry pediment.

Variants
The Hearts of Oak, a revolutionary New York militia commanded by Alexander Hamilton, wore badges of red tin hearts on their jackets with the words "God and Our Right".

The phrase was the inspiration for a joke motto by The Beatles, Duit on Mon Dei ("Do it on Monday") and Harry Nilsson's 1975 album Duit on Mon Dei.

Prince Philip, Duke of Edinburgh, as consort of the British monarch, used a similar motto: "God Is My Help".

Henry Hudson in 1612 used the wording  (God is my right).

Other people considered the phrase  (God is my right) means he was direct sovereign and not vassal of any other king.

See also
 , the motto of the British monarch for use in Scotland
Nemo me impune lacessit, the motto of Scotland
 , the motto of the Prince of Wales
 
 List of national mottos

References

French words and phrases
British monarchy
National mottos
National symbols of the United Kingdom